The 2018–19 season was Alashkert's seventh season in the Armenian Premier League and twelfth overall. Alashkert were defending Premier League champions, having won the title the previous three seasons. Domestically, Alashkert finished the season in fourth place, whilst winning the Armenian Cup and Armenian Supercup for the first time in their history, earning themselves qualification to the UEFA Europa League for the 2019–20 season. In Europe, Alashkert were knocked out of the Champions League by Celtic in the first qualifying round, and by CFR Cluj in the third qualifying round in the Europa League.

Season events
On 7 July, Alashkert announced the permanent signings of Goran Antonić, César Romero, Oliver Práznovský, Jefferson and the loan signing of Gustavo Marmentini.

Alashkert began their season by hosting Celtic at the Republican Stadium in the first qualifying round of the UEFA Champions League on 10 July. Goals from Odsonne Edouard, James Forrest and Callum McGregor, gave Celtic a 3–0 victory. The following week, 18 July, Alashkert traveled to Celtic Park to face Celtic in the second leg of their Champions League tie. Despite a first half sending off for Jozo Šimunović, two goals from Moussa Dembélé and one from James Forrest gave Celtic another 3–0 win and a 6–0 aggregate victory.

On 30 July, Alashkert announced the return of Lester Peltier to the club from Banants, however on 3 September, Peltier's contract was terminated by mutual consent in order to enable Peltier to join Saudi Arabian club Al-Mujazzal.

On 21 September 2018, Varuzhan Sukiasyan was fired as manager with Owner Bagrat Navoyan, and Alashkert-2 manager Sergey Erzrumyan taking temporary charge.

Squad

Transfers

In

Loans in

Out

Released

Competitions

Armenian Supercup

Armenian Premier League

Results summary

Results

Table

Armenian Cup

Final

UEFA Champions League

Qualifying rounds

UEFA Europa League

Qualifying rounds

Statistics

Appearances and goals

|-
|colspan="16"|Players who left Alashkert during the season:

|}

Goal scorers

Clean sheets

Disciplinary Record

References

FC Alashkert seasons
Alashkert
Alashkert